Matarifeː An Unnameable Mass Murderer, known simply as Matarife La Serie or Matarife, is a web series by the Colombian journalist, writer and lawyer Daniel Mendoza Leal. The documentary-type series narrates journalistic findings that would relate the life of  Álvaro Uribe Vélez with corrupt drug traffickers, paramilitaries, and politicians in Colombia. Premiered on social networks on Friday May 22, 2020, at 7:00 pm (19:00). It was financed and produced in Australia, United States and Colombia.

The series was announced by YouTube on May 11. The trailer shows that the series is aimed at showing the work of journalist Mendoza Leal, who for years has investigated the judicial processes in which the name of Álvaro Uribe Vélez.

The series is based on investigations by the journalist and lawyer Daniel Mendoza Leal, attorney in charge of the slander case against the journalist Gonzalo Guillén, denounced by Álvaro Uribe at the end of 2017. After winning the lawsuit they decided to publish the product of their investigations. The episodes are narrated in the first person by Mendoza.

The available information, however, does not have primary sources and has been controversial because some consider it a defamation against the politician, and others as an opportunity to know with more certainty about his judicial record, about whom they have branded as a dangerous criminal. Despite this, the series has enjoyed high expectations.

Development 
It is known that it will be a web series of 50 chapters with five seasons, with an average duration of 6 minutes, to be distributed by Telegram, WhatsApp and other important social networks. The reason for choosing These networks were afraid that the content would be decommissioned under censorship.

The trailer shows Uribe's alleged links with drug traffickers such as Pablo Escobar and  el Mexicano , paramilitaries and corruption scandals such as Odebrecht. The realization suggests that the common point of all those mentioned is Senator Uribe.

Throughout the week, the journalist Daniel Mendoza has given multiple interviews on the series, stating that he has allegedly been threatened by people related to the senator.

Release 
The first episode premiered via YouTube at 7:00 pm (19:00) Colombian time. The access links were available via Telegram and WhatsApp, where the entire chapter was finally posted, which was also published on the series' official channel on the video platform. It was a massive success and trend on social networks, reaching 2.5 million views on his YouTube channel in just 6 hours of the premiere of his first chapter.

English & French subtitles versions 
The Matarife YouTube Channel  also publishes versions that include English and French subtitles.

Awards 
The Matarife series production was granted two India Catalina awards on March 17, 2021, during the Cartagena Film Festival for the best online production and the best documentary series.

Upon receiving the awards, Daniel Mendoza gave a short speech to thank the public and those who supported him during the production and legal struggle that followed it:

“I dedicate this triumph to the victims left by the massacres and to those False Positives who were executed by the criminal corporation of mass murderer Álvaro Uribe Vélez. I thank César Andrade, the director, for his genius and professionalism, To Gónzalo, To Diana, to Marisol from La Nueva Prensa, To Juanca, my associate who led the legal defense of the series, together with Miguel Ángel Agusto and the people”

Synopsis 
The story begins with the attack on Club El Nogal, an event that occurred in 2003 and was attributed to the FARC.

Episodes

Season 1 - The Unnameable Genocidal

Season 2 - The Slaughter Lord
The second season had production problems because, according to his creator, the right-wing Colombian government lead by Iván Duque sought to censor the series in Colombia through lawsuits; As a consequence, Daniel Mendoza decided to move to Europe and broadcast the series from France to avoid any type of censorship under the Colombian jurisdiction. The second season was broadcast on July 20, 2021.

Season 3 - The Origin

References 

YouTube original programming
Non-fiction web series
Colombian television shows